The 2016 Big South Conference men's soccer season was the 33rd season of men's varsity soccer in the conference.

The Winthrop Eagles are both the defending regular season and conference tournament champions.

Changes from 2015 

 The Coastal Carolina Chanticleers are leaving the conference to join the Sun Belt Conference.

Teams

Stadiums and locations

Regular season

Results

Rankings

Postseason

Big South Tournament 

Tournament details to be announced.

NCAA tournament

All-Big South awards and teams

See also 
 2016 NCAA Division I men's soccer season
 2016 Big South Conference Men's Soccer Tournament
 2016 Big South Conference women's soccer season

References 

 
2016 NCAA Division I men's soccer season